Ko Nom Sao (lit. female breast island) are twin islands in  Phang Nga Bay, and are part of the Ko Panyi (เกาะปันหยี) subdistrict (tambon), Phang Nga Province, Thailand.

General
Ko Nom Sao is a geographical feature consisting of two small islands of similar appearance located close to each other. One of them, Ko Nom Sao Yai (เกาะนมสาวใหญ่), is slightly larger than the other, but from certain angles the silhouette of these islands looks like a pair of roughly identical woman's breasts.

These islands are also known as Ko Ok Meri.

Similarly named features
Ko Nom Sao, in Khao Sam Roi Yot area, Prachuap Khiri Khan. 
Ko Nom Sao, an island off the shore in Chanthaburi Province.

References

External links
Phang Nga Bay map
Ao Phang Nga National Park

See also
List of islands of Thailand
Breast-shaped hill

Geography of Phang Nga province
Islands of Thailand
Islands of the Strait of Malacca